This is the list of the top 50 albums of 2004 in New Zealand.

Chart

Key
 – Album of New Zealand origin

External links
 The Official NZ Music Chart, RIANZ website

Top 50 Albums
New Zealand Top 50 Albums
Albums 2004